Christopher Jay Potter (born August 23, 1960) is a Canadian actor, director, musician, and pitchman. He is primarily known for his roles on soap operas and prime-time television. Potter is known for his roles as Peter Caine, the son of Kwai Chang Caine (played by David Carradine) on the 1990s crime drama Kung Fu: The Legend Continues, Dr. David Cameron on the first season of Queer as Folk, as the voice of Gambit in the animated X-Men series, and for his recurring role as con-artist Evan Owen on The Young and the Restless. He plays Tim Fleming on the drama Heartland.

Early life
The oldest of three children, Potter was born in Toronto, Ontario, to Ron Potter, an ex-pro-football player and insurance executive, and Judith Potter, a singer. Potter was raised in London, Ontario and attended Oakridge Secondary School. He developed an interest in sports as well as in music and community theater.

Potter wanted a career as a professional athlete; however, his father would not permit it. He later quit college to start a career as a rock musician. He discovered a love for the theater and became a professional stage actor. He also worked on an oil rig in Northern Canada, sold cars, and later became an insurance salesman. He left the insurance company to start his career on TV, as an actor and a pitchman.

Career
After being a spokesman on many commercials in the 1980s, and his role in Material World, he finally made his mark in TV playing David Carradine's son and crime-fighting partner, Det. Peter Caine on Kung Fu: The Legend Continues, after receiving a contract with Warner Bros. in 1992, and remained close friends with Carradine until his death in 2009. His first role, in 1993, was a hit in both Canada and United States. He also appeared on Silk Stalkings and provided the voice of Gambit for at least the first four seasons of the X-Men animated series.

Potter was featured in Rocket's Red Glare (2000). He appeared on the first season as Dr. David Cameron on Queer as Folk opposite Hal Sparks, and he starred in a mini-series A Wrinkle in Time (2003) for ABC. He also co-starred with Joely Fisher in Zoe Busiek: Wild Card from 2003 to 2005. Potter also appeared in Spymate (2006).

The following year, he landed another role opposite Amber Marshall in the CBC Television series Heartland playing the role of Tim Fleming. Also in 2007, Potter joined the cast of The Young and the Restless in a recurring role as Evan Owen, playing opposite Judith Chapman, with whom he had previously appeared on an episode of Silk Stalkings; Potter remained on The Young and the Restless until being written out in early 2008.

From 2008 to 2014 Potter was in a series of TV movies featuring The Good Witch, portraying Jake Russell. On three of the films, The Good Witch's Charm, The Good Witch's Destiny and The Good Witch's Wonder, he was co-executive producer. One of his co-stars Catherine Disher had previously worked with him, on the X-Men and two episodes of KF:TLC. Potter was unable to continue the role on the Good Witch television series because of scheduling conflicts with his work on Heartland.

Personal life
Potter is married to Karen, and they have four children.

Selected filmography

Films

Television

Director
 Heartland
 episode #45: "The Happy List" - January 31, 2010
 episode #64: "The River" - February 27, 2011
 episode #65: "Never Surrender" - March 6, 2011
 episode #98: "Waiting For Tomorrow" - February 10, 2013
 episode #110: "Best Man" - November 17, 2013
 episode #111: "Hotshot" - December 1, 2013
 episode #128: "Walk a Mile" - November 9, 2014
 episode #129: "The Family Tree" - November 23, 2014
 episode #144: "Back in the Saddle" - November 1, 2015
 episode #145: "Over and Out" - November 8, 2015
 episode #164: "Riding Shotgun" - November 13, 2016
 episode #165: "Here and Now" - November 20, 2016
 episode #182: "Our Sons and Daughters" - November 12, 2017
 episode #183: "Truth Be Told" - November 19, 2017
 episode #194: "Dare to Dream" - January 6, 2019
 episode #195: "Hearts Run Free" - January 13, 2019
 episode #200: "Running Scared" - March 3, 2019
 episode #211: "The Art of Trust" - November 3, 2019
 episode #212: "Legacy" - November 10, 2019
 episode #217: "Making Amends" - January 24, 2021
 Silk Stalkings
 episode #168: "It's The Great Pumpkin, Harry" - January 24, 1999
 episode #160: "Hidden Agenda" - August 30, 1998
 episode #154: "Genius" - April 19, 1998

References

External links
 

1960 births
Living people
Male actors from Toronto
Canadian male film actors
Canadian male television actors
Canadian male voice actors
20th-century Canadian male actors
21st-century Canadian male actors